Epipaschia mesoleucalis is a species of snout moth in the genus Epipaschia. It is found in French Guiana and Guatemala.

References

Moths described in 1916
Epipaschiinae